Kalhor is a Kurdish tribe and their dialect, "Kalhori", has been categorized as a branch of Southern Kurdish.

History
The tribe is described as the most powerful tribe in the province of Kermanshah and the surrounding region, and also described as "one of the most ancient, if not the most ancient, of the tribes of Kurdistan". The Kalhoris were mentioned by Sharaf-al-Din Bedlisi in the late 16th century, according to whom, the chiefs of the Kalhor claimed to be descended from Giv, the son of Goudarz (q.v.), a major hero in the Shahnameh.

Areas
Kalhor tribe populate cities and towns such as Qasr-e Shirin, Sarpol-e Zahab, Gilan-e Gharb, Eslamabad-e Gharb, Kermanshah, Eyvan and Zarneh in Iran. In Iraq, they mainly populate Khanaqin.

See also 

 Kayhan Kalhor
 Sanjabi
 Zangana
 Suramiri
 Feyli

References

Kurdish tribes